Gravitaativarravitar is the second studio album by the rock band Gravitar. It was released on November 7, 1995 by Charnel Music.

Track listing

Personnel 
Adapted from the Gravitaativarravitar liner notes.

Gravitar
 Eric Cook – drums, percussion
 Harold Richardson – electric guitar
 Geoff Walker – clarinet, vocals

Production and additional personnel
 John D'Agostini – production, engineering, mixing
 Gravitar – production
 Jeff Heikes – photography
 Haruo Satuo – additional guitar (9)
 Jeremy Sell – cover art, design
 Michael J. Walker – additional vocals (10)
 Matthew Watt – cover art, design

Release history

References

External links 
 Gravitaativarravitar at Discogs (list of releases)

1995 albums
Charnel Music albums
Gravitar (band) albums